Sikandrabad Assembly constituency is one of the 403 constituencies of the Uttar Pradesh Legislative Assembly, India. It is a part of the Bulandshahar district and one of the 5 assembly constituencies in the Gautam Buddh Nagar Lok Sabha constituency. First election in this assembly constituency was held in 1957 after the "DPACO (1956)" (delimitation order) was passed in 1956. After the "Delimitation of Parliamentary and Assembly Constituencies Order" was passed in 2008, the constituency was assigned identification number 64.

Wards / Areas
Extent of Sikandrabad Assembly constituency is Sikandrabad Tehsil; PCs Chhapravat, Baral, Sainta, Kurli, Kota, Bhamra, Anchana, Girdharpur Navada, Gulaothi (Dehat), Auladha, Maholi of Agouta KC & Gulaothi MB of Bulandshahr Tehsil.

Members of the Legislative Assembly

Election results

2022

16th Vidhan Sabha: 2012 General Elections.

See also
Bulandshahar district
Gautam Buddha Nagar Lok Sabha constituency
Sixteenth Legislative Assembly of Uttar Pradesh
Uttar Pradesh Legislative Assembly

References

External links
 

Assembly constituencies of Uttar Pradesh
Politics of Bulandshahr district
Constituencies established in 1956
1956 establishments in Uttar Pradesh